Carrie Lingo (born September 27, 1979) is an American field hockey player. She competed in the women's tournament at the 2008 Summer Olympics. She was also a member of the Women's National Team that won the silver medal at the  2003 Pan American Games, in Santo Domingo, Dominican Republic.

References

External links
 

1979 births
Living people
American female field hockey players
Olympic field hockey players of the United States
Field hockey players at the 2008 Summer Olympics
Sportspeople from Wilmington, Delaware
Pan American Games medalists in field hockey
Pan American Games silver medalists for the United States
Field hockey players at the 2003 Pan American Games
Medalists at the 2003 Pan American Games
21st-century American women